Megalia was a controversial radical feminist online community based in South Korea. It was launched in 2015 to protest the language policy of the South Korean Internet forum DC Inside, which some users deemed discriminatory against women.

Overview 
In the spring of 2015, South Korean Internet forum DC Inside started "MERS Gallery" as a forum for sharing information on the Middle East respiratory syndrome (MERS) outbreak.

When a false rumor spread that two women who had contracted MERS refused quarantine and instead went on a shopping trip to Hong Kong, it prompted bashing in this forum. These supposed health code violators were derogated with the term "kimchi woman" (gimchi-nyeo), a misogynist term for women who only have shopping on their minds.

As this continued, an influx of feminist users started using reactionary terms, coining "kimchi man" (gimchi-nam) a reclaimed term which mocks Korean men. DC Inside intervened by instituting a policy, which forbade usage of "kimchi man". A portion of its users regarded the measure as discriminatory, and found these rules constraining and moved to other forums at DC Inside, eventually launching their own website, Megalia. The name "Megalia" is a portmanteau of "MERS Gallery" and Egalia's Daughters, a feminist novel by Gerd Brantenberg.

Culture 
In Megalia, there are several boards, including the "best" board, "new posts" board, "Menyeom (meaning suitable for Megalia) board", "news" board, "data" board, "lecture" board, "capture" board, "humor" board, and "free" board.

Movement

SoraNet shut down Project 
Megalia began a movement to halt the porn-sharing site  distributing non-consensual secretly photographed video content, and has moved on to petition the shutdown of the site itself, which was notorious for various types of illegal pornographic content. Eventually, SoraNet was shut down.

Post-it Project 
They put a lot of post-it notes with phrases that protect women's rights on the walls of shared toilets, elevators, etc. And they took a certification shot and gave it to their community. Participants expressed their identity by writing the phrase 'Megalian in action' at the end of the phrase.

No hydrochloric acid sales online Project 
Megalia led a campaign to ban sales, pointing out the problems of high concentrations of hydrochloric acid being sold in online open markets. As a result, the Ministry of Environment has blocked online sales of high concentrations of hydrochloric acid by signing agreements with three open market companies.

Controversies
Online critics claim Megalians' mirroring tactic is hateful and misandrist; to supporters, they are reclaiming a male-centered language that threatens and discriminates against women.

Their logo is taken by some men and Megalians as a derogatory and deliberately provocative reference to the size of Korean penises.

Many, including some feminists, say Megalia's tactics are unproductive and divisive. Some Megalia posters have outed gay men who are married to women.

On October 17, 2015, a kindergarten teacher anonymously uploaded a post declaring their desire to have sexual intercourse with a Jonnini, which is Megalia slang for a male child. The poster (referred to by the media as "Ms. A") later addressed this, and while admitting the gravity of her statement, claimed that she was merely trying to bring awareness to the fact that male-dominated boards such as Ilbe allegedly routinely discuss sexual desires for underage girls (referred to as lolini ('Lolita girl').

Users of Megalia have posted gory images of men whose genitalia have been severed or severely damaged and publicized explicit photos without consent.

In October 2018, following the Isu Station assault case, more than 129,500 Koreans signed an online petition asking for the presidential office to take measures against Womad and Megalia.

Derived websites 
 WOMAD is a website derived from Megalia on January 22, 2016. It is a splinter group that formed when Megalia issued a ban on use of slurs against gay men.
 Megalia 4 is a Facebook page that derived from Megalia in 2016.
 Ladism is a website that derived from Megalia in 2016.

Explanatory notes

See also 

 Feminism in South Korea
 Gender-based violence
 Misogyny
 DC Inside
WOMAD

References

External links 
  (archived) 
 South Korea's Gender Wars. 101 East, Al Jazeera English, April 2017 (video, 25 mins)

Internet properties established in 2015
South Korean websites
Internet forums
Feminism in South Korea
Feminist websites
Radical feminism